The Charkhlik revolt was a Uighur uprising in 1935 against Chinese Muslim-dominated Tunganistan, which was administered by the New 36th Division. The Chinese Muslim troops quickly and brutally defeated the Uighur revolt. Over 100 Uighurs were executed. The revolt leader's family were made hostages.

References

Military history of the Republic of China (1912–1949)
Wars involving the Republic of China
East Turkestan independence movement
Conflicts in 1935
20th century in Xinjiang
1935 in China